A mia-mia is a temporary shelter made of bark, branches, leaves and grass used by some Indigenous Australians. The word is also used in Australian English to mean "a temporary shelter". Coming from the Wathawurrung language, the term is also used in New Zealand, where it is usually spelt mai-mai and has the slightly different meaning of a shelter or hide used by a duck-hunter.

See also 
 Humpy

External links
 The mystery of mia-mia (Australian National Dictionary Centre at the Australian National University) (archived)

House types
Australian Aboriginal words and phrases
Indigenous architecture
Huts in Australia